Rainer Ernst (born 31 December 1961) is a German former professional footballer who amassed 56 caps for the East Germany national team. He was the last captain of East Germany before the political change.

Club career

Youth career 
Ernst was born in Neustrelitz. He began his football career when he was seven years old, at the youth side of BSG Empor Neustrelitz where his father Joachim "Jochen" Ernst became his first trainer. His Father Jochen stayed by his side at SG Dynamo Neustrelitz and in the training centre from 1973 to 1975. He participated in the V.Kinder- und Jugendspartakiade 1975 Berlin, with the Neubrandenburg student district selection as the captain and his father as the trainer. On 27 July Neubrandenburg met Karl-Marx-Stadt at the final, lost 2–1 but it was a sensation, Ernst was selected as the centre midfield of Spartakiade-Eleven 1975.
Then he joined the youth academy of BFC Dynamo in 1975.
There he succeeded: the runner-up of East Germany Student championship 1975–76 (he was absent from the final in the Sportforum Gräfenhainichen between FC Karl-Marx-Stadt and BFC Dynamo), the winner of Junior championship 1977–78 and 1978–79 (decided on the penultimate match day), the winner of Youth championship 1980–81 (16 matches, four goals) with Frank Rohde, Christian Backs et al.

Clubs

BFC Dynamo 
Ernst made his first appearance in the DDR-Oberliga on 6 June 1979, the 25th and penultimate match day of 1978–79 season, away game against BSG Chemie Böhlen which ended with a 10–3 victory. Though being unlisted for that match, he was brought from the junior squad and played for 90 minutes as one of the starting lineup.
The next and last matchday, 9 June 1979, he played for 57 minutes of the match against FC Karl-Marx-Stadt as the substitute for number 10 Hartmut Pelka. FUWO rated him 5, same as Hans-Jürgen Riediger and Wolf-Rüdiger Netz. The title had been already decided on the 24th match day, 26 May 1979 as BFC Dynamo beat the competitor SG Dynamo Dresden.

BFC Dynamo received the gold medal of Oberliga in Jahn-Sportpark Berlin, which was the first of ten consecutive gold medals; Ernst won the remaining nine. He was promoted to the senior squad in the summer of 1979.

His first goal for Oberliga was at the 19th match day of the season 1980–81, BFC Dynamo 5–1 Wismut Aue 28 March 1981, 4–0 goal (60 min.). It was his twelfth Oberliga match. Captain Frank Terletzki took the corner kick, Falko Götz did the flick-on then Ernst hit the ball over the line from two metres.

Ernst became the top scorer of the Oberliga 1983–84 and 1984–85 twice in a row. 1983–84: 20 goals (two penalties) nine home 11 away 26 matches. 1984–85: 24 goals (eight penalties) 11 home 13 away, 25 matches.

He played 216 DDR-Oberliga matches for BFC Dynamo, scoring 91 goals, became DDR-Oberliga champion nine times, 1979 and eight in a row from 1981 to 1988, and won the FDGB-Pokal gold medal twice 1988 and 1989. He made 31 appearances for the European cup's scoring seven goals in total.

1. FC Kaiserslautern 
As the Berlin Wall opened, Ernst received contract offer from Borussia Dortmund but BFC did not let him go. In the summer of 1990, he signed the contract with 1. FC Kaiserslautern and stayed with the club for one season, playing 18 games and scoring two goals.

In France 
Ernst moved to the French league with FC Girondins de Bordeaux for 1991–92. With Bordeaux he scored seven goals in 27 matches, six goals throughout the season, of which three penalties on the 33 matchdays of Division 2. That derby match against Saint-Seurin-sur-l'Isle ended with 3–0 and Bordeaux decided their return to Division 1. Ernst did not return with the club, as in the summer of 1992 he moved to AS Cannes in Ligue 2. He played just seven games in Cannes and scored no goals.

In Switzerland 
Ernst transferred to FC Zürich the following season. He then moved to Servette FC in 1993–94.

FSV Salmrohr and retirement 
Ernst returned to Germany in 1994 to spend two years in the regional league with FSV Salmrohr. He retired from professional football in 1996.

International career 

Ernst participated in 1980 UEFA European Under-18 Championship which was held in East Germany as the captain of the East Germany Junior team. 16 May Weissenfels East Germany 0-1 Bulgaria, 18 May Torgau East Germany 2–0 France, 20 May Magdeburg East Germany 0–0 Netherlands, East Germany resulted as the second of the group B, didn't proceed to the semifinals.

The same year he scored his first Oberliga goal, he celebrated his debut for the East Germany A-national team, which was the last qualifying match of the 1982 FIFA World Cup. At the match against Malta, Ernst-Abbe-Sportfeld in Jena 11 November 1981, he played from 79 minutes as the substitute for Wolfgang Steinbach and the match resulted 5–1 victory.
But that 11 minutes robbed him of his all Olympic hopes because of FIFA's decision that prevented the players who had played a World Cup match from participating in the Olympics.

His first goal for East Germany was at their fifth qualifying match of the UEFA Euro 1984, against Switzerland at the Berlin Jahn-Sportpark. In the 73rd minute Ersnt received a pass from Joachim Streich and elegantly lobbed Swiss Goalkeeper Roger Berbig from 22 meters. Joachim Streich added another goal at 94 minutes to make the game 3–0, their first win in five qualifying matches. Ernst played as number 10 for their sixth qualifying match of the 1986 FIFA World Cup against France in a fully-filled Zentralstadion on 11 September 1985. He converted Andreas Thom's cross with a header at 53 minutes into the match, which brought the team a 1–0 lead. And he overtook four French players with his 40-meter-solo dribbling, whistles (at BFC Dynamo players) fell silent and he gained the whole stadium's sympathy. The match resulted 2–0 victory over the European champions.

Ernst was the team captain for his last appearances for East Germany.
He was called up by the trainer Ede Geyer for the friendly match with Belgium on 12 September 1990, but he announced his withdrawal from the national team, saying he lost motivation.

He made 56 appearances during 1981–1990, making him 16th most-capped East German player. He scored 20 goals, making him the 4th top scorer. 

After ending his playing career, Ernst started a sport shop and studio in his hometown Neustrelitz.

He occasionally plays for the DDR tradition's team.

References

External links
 
 

1961 births
Living people
People from Neustrelitz
People from Bezirk Neubrandenburg
German footballers
East German footballers
Footballers from Mecklenburg-Western Pomerania
East Germany international footballers
Association football forwards
DDR-Oberliga players
Bundesliga players
Ligue 2 players
Berliner FC Dynamo players
1. FC Kaiserslautern players
FC Girondins de Bordeaux players
AS Cannes players
FC Zürich players
FSV Salmrohr players
German expatriate footballers
German expatriate sportspeople in France
Expatriate footballers in France